Brandy snaps are a popular snack or dessert food in the United Kingdom, Ireland, Australia and New Zealand, similar to the Italian cannoli. Brandy snaps are customarily served filled with whipped cream.

They are commonly made from a mixture of  golden syrup, flour, ginger, cream, sugar, butter and lemon juice. A variation on the recipe included bicarbonate of soda, egg and self-raising flour instead. The snaps are cooked on a moderate heat and are baked briefly as a flat disc that is then rolled while still hot and soft. The whipped cream can be sweetened with brandy or vanilla.  However, the name brandy snap has no reference to brandy, the spirit. The name "brandy" is related to "branded" (as in burnt).

History 
An early Victorian etymology for brandy snaps is "brand-schnap, from being burnt, not for the real or supposed presence of brandy".

The brandy snap is a popular sweet snack sold at the annual Hull Fair, held every October. The product sold at the fair  has traditionally been made by Wright and Co. at its Bridge End Works in Brighouse, West Yorkshire.

References 

British desserts
Irish cuisine
Australian desserts
New Zealand desserts
Biscuits